The SPARCstation IPC (Sun 4/40, code-named Phoenix) is a workstation sold by Sun Microsystems, introduced July 1990. It is based on the sun4c architecture, and is enclosed in a lunchbox chassis.

Specifications

CPU support
The SPARCstation IPC incorporates a 25 MHz Fujitsu MB86901A or LSI L64801 processor. The SPARCstation IPC is limited to use as a single-processor machine.

Memory 
The SPARCstation IPC has twelve SIMM memory slots, in three 4-slot groups. Each group of 4 slots can be filled with either four 1MB SIMMs or four 4MB SIMMs, for a maximum of 48MB.

Disk drives 
The SPARCstation IPC can hold one internal 3.5", 50-pin, single ended, fast-narrow SE SCSI disk drive and a 3.5" 1.44 MB floppy drive. Both are mounted in the top cover of the case. The hard disk slot supports higher drives than the 1 inch format that became standard later. It also supports external SCSI devices.  There is no IDE/ATAPI support. Modern 80-pin SCA drives can work with an adapter, but do not fit inside the case due to the size of the adapter.

Interfaces 
The SPARCstation IPC has the following interfaces:

 SCSI
 Ethernet
 Two RS-232/RS-423 serial ports: 8-pin mini-DIN connectors (DB-25 adapter cables are provided)
 Video: DB13W3 connector for integrated bwtwo monochrome framebuffer
 Keyboard, mouse: two 8-pin mini-DIN connectors
 Two SBus slots

Network support
The SPARCstation IPC comes with an on-board AMD Lance Ethernet chipset and a 15-pin AUI connector, which can connect to 10BASE2, 10BASE5 or 10BASE-T via an appropriate transceiver. The OpenBoot ROM is able to boot from network, using RARP and TFTP. Like all other SPARCstation systems, the IPC holds system information such as MAC address and serial number in NVRAM. If the battery on this chip dies, then the system will not be able to boot without manual intervention (keyboard entry of boot parameters).

NVRAM 
The SPARCstation IPC uses an M48T02 battery-backed RTC with RAM chip which handles the real time clock and boot parameter storage. An issue with this chip is that the battery is internal, which means the entire chip must be replaced when its battery runs out. As all SPARCstation IPCs made are now older than the battery life of this chip, a substantial number of these systems now refuse to boot.  Additionally, the SPARCstation IPC design used the reserved bits in the M48T02's NVRAM in a non-standard way; since later revisions of the M48T02 chip exert stricter control over these bits, a current M48T02 will store the NVRAM data, but the RTC will not function correctly and the system may fail to auto-boot.

Due to incompatibilities with modern M48T02s, it is common to modify failed NVRAMs by cutting into the encapsulation and patching in a new battery. It is also possible to replace the entire encapsulation, which also contains a 32.768 kHz clock crystal.

Operating systems
The following operating systems will run on a SPARCstation IPC:
SunOS 4.0.3c onwards
Solaris 2.0 to Solaris 7
Linux – Some but not all distributions still support this SPARC32 sub-architecture
NetBSD/sparc32 since 1.0
OpenBSD/sparc32 - All versions up to 5.9 (OpenBSD 5.9 was the last release to support SPARC32)

Related computers 
The SPARCstation 1+ (Sun 4/65) is architecturally very similar but housed in a pizza box form factor.

The SPARCstation IPX (Sun 4/50) is a later lunchbox form factor system.

See also 
 SPARCstation IPX
 SPARCstation LX
 SPARCstation
 SPARCstation 5

References

External links 
 Obsolyte: SPARCstation IPC
 Parts List for SPARCstation IPC
 Documentation

Sun workstations
SPARC microprocessor products